Zand Institute of Higher Education (Persian: موسسه غیر انتفاعی زند, Musish-e Qir-e Antefa'i-ye Zend) also known as Zand University is an educational establishment in Iran.

It was established by virtue of the 1994 Law of non–governmental and non-profitable universities and institutions through the efforts of ten professors from the University of Shiraz.
Zand institute of higher education is governed according to educational regulations of the High Council of Cultural Revolution and the Ministry of Science, Research and Technology, the latter endorsing its credential degrees. Like many other universities and institutes affiliated with the Ministry, it admits students through the National Entrance Examination held by the Iranian Educational Testing Organization. The students are therefore to comply with the rules and regulations set by the mentioned Council and Ministry in all aspects of their education including matters related to student affairs, discipline, tuition and fees.

External links 
 Zand University official website

Universities in Iran
Buildings and structures in Shiraz
Education in Shiraz